Ravenel B. Curry III is an American businessman and philanthropist.

Biography

Early life
Ravenel, a native of Greenwood, South Carolina, graduated from Furman University in 1963.

Career
He began his investment career as a security analyst at Morgan Guaranty Trust Company, was a partner at H.C. Wainwright and a Portfolio Manager of the Duke Endowment. Curry is currently the President and CIO of Eagle Capital Management, an investment management firm headquartered in New York City which he co-Founded with his late wife Beth Curry in 1988.

Philanthropy
He sits on the Board of Trustees of the American Enterprise Institute, the Manhattan Institute for Policy Research, The Duke Endowment, the New York Hall of Science, the New-York Historical Society, the Genetics Endowment of South Carolina, the Blanton-Peale Institute (named for Norman Vincent Peale), and his alma mater, Furman University. In 2004, he donated US$1 million to support the Chinese Studies program at Furman University, and, in 2023, he donated US$10 million to support the renovation of Furman University's basketball arena. He has previously sserved as a Trustee of Furman University, as President of the Furman University Alumni Board and as Chair of the New Jersey Higher Education Assistance Authority. Currently, Curry serves as a Trustee of the American Enterprise Institute, the Manhattan Institute, the New York Hall of Science, the New-York Historical Society, the Genetics Endowment of South Carolina. He is a Trustee Emeritus of Success Academy and a member of the Council on Foreign Relations.

He and Beth Curry founded the Ravenel and Elizabeth Curry Foundation, which made major contributions to Rockefeller University, Weill Cornell Medical College and Queens University of Charlotte, N.C.

Personal life
He married Elizabeth Rivers Curry (née Mary Elizabeth Rivers) (1941-2015) in 1963.

References

Businesspeople from New York City
Furman University alumni
Philanthropists from New York (state)
American Enterprise Institute
Living people
Year of birth missing (living people)
Date of birth missing (living people)
Place of birth missing (living people)